Mount Bureto is a mountain in southern Albania in the geographical region of Southern Albanian Highlands. It is part of the mountain chain Shëndelli-Lunxhëri-Bureto chain, which goes parallel to the Trebeshinë-Dhembel-Nemërçkë chain. Its highest elevation, Arkovolë, is 1,763 m. Its orientation is north to south. The valley of the river Drino and the town Libohovë lie to its west.

References

Mountains of Albania